Dhanbari is an upazila under Tangail District in the division of Dhaka. It was formed in 2006 by the efforts of Fakir Mahbub Anam Swapan,Central BNP leader who contest in the constituency Tangail-1 (Madhupur -Dhanbari) .Former Madhupur Upazila was split into two Upazilas - (Madhupur and Dhanbari) to form this Upazila.

Notable people :
Nawab Syed Ali Hasan Ali Choudhury,
Dr. Sheikh Nizamul 
Islam, MP, 
Syeda Ashika Akbar, MP, 
Dr.Abdur Razzaq, MP.

Administration
Dhanbari Upazila is divided into Dhanbari  Municipality and seven union parishads: Baniajan, Birtara, Bolibhadra, Dhopakhali, Jodunathpur, Musuddi, and Paiska. The union parishads are subdivided into 103 mauzas and 132 villages.

Dhanbari Municipality is subdivided into 9 wards and 25 mahallas.

Education

There are seven colleges in the upazila: Asya Hasan Ali Mohila Degree College, Bhai Ghat Ideal College, Dhanbari College, Mushuddi Razia College, Norilla College, Panchpotol Degree College, and Ukhariabari College.

According to Banglapedia, Govt. Dhanbari Nawab Institution, founded in 1910, Paiska High School (1960), and Pankata Islamia Secondary School (1943) are notable secondary schools.

See also 
Dhanbari
Upazilas of Bangladesh
Districts of Bangladesh
Divisions of Bangladesh

References

 
Upazilas of Tangail District